Malappuram is a city in Kerala, India. It may also refer to:
 Malappuram metropolitan area, an urban agglomeration in Kerala
 Malappuram district, a district in Kerala
 Malappuram (State Assembly constituency), a constituency in Kerala
 Malappuram (Lok Sabha constituency), a lok sabha constituency in Kerala